Thomas Arthur Askey (born October 4, 1974) is an American former professional ice hockey goaltender. He was drafted by the Mighty Ducks of Anaheim as their eighth-round pick, #186 overall, in the 1993 NHL Entry Draft.

Playing career

Askey spent four seasons with Ohio State University of the CCHA from 1992/93 to 1995/96 improving his game every year. In 1996 he joined the Mighty Ducks organisation, playing for their affiliate Baltimore Bandits, sharing the duties in net with Mike Bales.

Askey has appeared in 7 NHL games with the Mighty Ducks. After Guy Hebert went down with an injury on March 8, Askey was called up from Cincinnati to serve as the back up behind Mikhail Shtalenkov for the remainder of the season. He made his NHL debut on March 13, 1998 against the Dallas Stars. Askey had two more appearances versus Colorado and Phoenix replacing Shtalenkov in net and stopping all 17 shots before getting his first start against Calgary in a 3–3 tie on April 5, 1998 stopping 32 shots. He came in relief once again on April 9 against the Sharks allowing one goal. He had two more starts tying the Avalanche 2–2 with 23 saves on April 13 and losing to the Blues 3-5 making 20 saves on April 19.

He saw playoff action in April 1999, replacing Guy Hebert in Game 1 halfway through the second period against the Detroit Red Wings, losing the game 3–5.

He signed with HIFK in the Finnish SM-liiga for the 2005–06 season, and was traded to Jokerit in January 2006. After Jokerit failed to make the playoffs, Askey transferred to HC Fribourg-Gottéron in the Swiss Nationalliga A. In the late summer of 2006, Askey signed with the Kalamazoo Wings of the United Hockey League in a return to the town where he and his family makes its off-season home. He moved to the Serie A league in Italy for Hockey Club Alleghe before moving to the Nottingham Panthers in the Elite Ice Hockey League for the end of the 2007/08 season, helping them to win the Challenge Cup.

Career statistics

Regular season and playoffs

International

Awards
 Hap Holmes Memorial Award (with Mika Noronen) in 2001

External links
 

1974 births
Living people
American men's ice hockey goaltenders
Anaheim Ducks draft picks
Baltimore Bandits players
Cincinnati Mighty Ducks players
HC Alleghe players
HC Fribourg-Gottéron players
HIFK (ice hockey) players
Houston Aeros (1994–2013) players
Ice hockey people from Buffalo, New York
Jokerit players
Kalamazoo Wings (UHL) players
Kansas City Blades players
Mighty Ducks of Anaheim players
Nottingham Panthers players
Ohio State Buckeyes men's ice hockey players
Rochester Americans players